"Tranquilize" is a song by Las Vegas-based rock band the Killers, featuring Lou Reed. Written by Brandon Flowers, it is featured on the compilation album Sawdust. The song was made available for download on iTunes from October 12, 2007. A limited edition etched 7-inch vinyl of "Tranquilize" was available from November 5, featuring a lyric from the song hand-picked by Brandon Flowers etched on one side.

The song reached number 13 on the UK Singles Chart and also charted in Australia, Austria, and Canada. It won Best International Alternative/Indie Track at NMEs first ever USA awards. It was featured in a trailer for the fifth and final season of HBO's original series Boardwalk Empire.

Background
"It took a day to break the ice with him," Flowers said of Reed. "The second day of recording was a lot nicer than the first. On the first day we were all really stiff. It's funny, because you refer to him as 'Lou Reed', not 'Lou'. I remember somebody came into the studio. They could only stay in the room with him for two minutes. They left, saying, 'Lou Reed's really freaking me out.'"

Music video
The music video features Lou Reed and was released on the 29 October 2007 in the UK.

The video features Flowers wandering around an empty house. Somewhere in the house is Lou Reed, sitting at a piano. Flowers sings the song, including Reed's parts, making it look like he has been possessed. Intercut with this are shots of the rest of the band in a darkly lit, red room, around a table, apparently performing a seance. The video ends with Flowers finding and pointing at Reed, singing his outro.

Live performances
In concert, Flowers changes the lyrics at the end from "the Bushes and the bombs are tranquilized" to "the vampires and the bombs are tranquilized".

Awards and nominations

|-
| rowspan="2"|2008
| rowspan="2"|NME Awards
| Best Indie/Alternative Track
| 
|-
| Best Video
| 
|}

Track listing
UK single-sided 7-inch vinyl
 "Tranquilize"

Charts

References

 New song featuring Lou Reed

External links
Watch "Tranquilize" on YouTube

2007 singles
2007 songs
Island Records singles
The Killers songs
Lou Reed songs
Music videos directed by Anthony Mandler
Political songs
Protest songs
Songs written by Brandon Flowers
Vertigo Records singles